Sainte-Euphémie may refer to:

 Sainte-Euphémie, a commune in the Ain department in eastern France
 Sainte-Euphémie-sur-Rivière-du-Sud, Quebec, amunicipality in the Montmagny Regional County Municipality within the Chaudière-Appalaches region of Quebec
 Sainte-Euphémie-sur-Ouvèze, a commune in the Drôme department in southeastern France.
 Sainte-Euphémie Koleji, a high school in Kadıköy, Istanbul, Turkey.

See also
 Euphemie (disambiguation) 
 Santa Eufemia (disambiguation)
 Sant'Eufemia (disambiguation)